Lieutenant General James John McLeod Innes  (5 February 1830 – 13 December 1907) was a Scottish recipient of the Victoria Cross, the highest and most prestigious award for gallantry in the face of the enemy that can be awarded to British and Commonwealth forces.

Born in British India to Scottish parents, Innes was educated privately, then at Edinburgh University and at Addiscombe Military Seminary, military academy of the East India Company  where he was awarded the Pollock Medal. He was commissioned into the Bengal Engineers in 1848 and, after further training, he arrived in India in November 1850. When the Indian Mutiny began in May 1857 he was at Lucknow, where he helped to defend the city throughout its siege. After the evacuation of Lucknow in November 1897, he served in military operations in Oudh State. 

Innes was a 28 year old lieutenant in the Bengal Engineers, Bengal Army during the Indian Mutiny on 23 February 1858 at Sultanpore, India, where he was awarded Victoria Cross for the following deed:

For his work in the Mutiny, he was also mentioned in dispatches three times and received the brevet rank of major.

After the Mutiny campaign Innes continued to serve in India, with the Royal Engineers (Bengal). After holding a number of military and civil engineering posts, he was finally promoted to major-general in 1885. In March 1886 he retired with the honorary rank of lieutenant-general, after which he wrote a number of books, mostly relating to the history of the Indian Mutiny. In June 1907, on the fiftieth anniversary of the Mutiny, Innes became a Companion of the Order of the Bath (CB), military division. He died on 13 December 1907 aged 77 at his home in Cambridge.

His Victoria Cross is displayed in the Royal Engineers Museum at Chatham, England.

Works
 
 The Sepoy Revolt, Ad. Innes & Co (1 January 1897), ASIN:B0028SZ7UK
 
 The Life and Times of General Sir James Browne RE KCB KCSI (Buster Browne), John Murray; (1 January 1905) ASIN:B001Q4DNMQ

References

Monuments to Courage (David Harvey, 1999)
The Register of the Victoria Cross (This England, 1997)
The Sapper VCs (Gerald Napier, 1998)

External links

Biography of Innes Comprehensive Guide to the VC & GC
Royal Engineers Museum Sappers VCs
Location of grave and VC medal (Cambridgeshire)

Oxford Dictionary of National Biography entry

British recipients of the Victoria Cross
Companions of the Order of the Bath
1830 births
1907 deaths
Military personnel of British India
Indian Rebellion of 1857 recipients of the Victoria Cross
British Army lieutenant generals
Royal Engineers officers
British biographers
British military writers
Alumni of the University of Edinburgh
Graduates of Addiscombe Military Seminary
Bengal Engineers officers
Burials at the Cambridge City Cemetery